The 2012 WAFL season was the 128th season of the West Australian Football League and its various incarnations. The season opened on 17 March, with  hosting  at Leederville Oval, and concluded with the 2012 WAFL Grand Final, in which  defeated  by 26 points. The 2012 Sandover Medal was won by Kane Mitchell of Claremont, while the leading goalkicker was 's Ben Saunders.

Pre-season News and Rule changes
On 1 February, it was announced that the West Australian Football Commission (WAFC) had signed a new three-year deal with sports company Burley-Sekem as the officially endorsed supplier of footballs to all WA competition, maintaining a strong relationship with Burley that dates back to 1907.

The WAFL implemented one major rule change in accordance with changes at AFL level in regard to the rushed behind rule:
 A free kick would be awarded against a player who intentionally rushes a behind over the attacking team's goal or behind line or into a goal post. The umpires were to give the defender the benefit of the doubt and the point would be awarded if the defender was deemed to be under sufficient pressure.

On 27 February the following amendments were accepted by the WAFC Football Affairs Committee:
 An annual 3 per cent increase in the WAFL Salary Cap, starting in 2012 to $217,000
 Due to widespread support for retention of loyal players, a maximum of $10,000 outside of the Salary Cap could be paid to one veteran player (one who had played 100 or more games at one WAFL club). This amendment ran on a trial basis.
 A fixed fine for late lodgement of Salary Cap documents plus a daily non-compliance fine of $50 per day
 Introduction of Weekly League match prizes of up to $750.

Clubs

Home-and-away season

Round 1

Round 2

Round 3

Round 4

Round 5

Round 6

Round 7

Round 8

Round 9

Round 10

State game

Round 11 (Rivalry Round)

Round 12

Round 13

Round 14

Round 15 (NAIDOC Week)

Round 16

Round 17

Round 18

Round 19

Round 20

Round 21

Round 22

Round 23

Round 24

Ladder

Finals

Semi-finals

Preliminary final

Grand Final

See also
2012 Foxtel Cup

References

External links
2012 Season results on Australian Football
Official WAFL website

West Australian Football League seasons
WAFL